Lillebror Johansson is a former international speedway rider from Sweden.

Speedway career 
Johansson won the silver medal at the 1979 Swedish Championship. He rode in the top tier of British Speedway from 1982 to 1983, riding for Eastbourne Eagles.

References 

Living people
Year of birth missing (living people)
Swedish speedway riders
Eastbourne Eagles riders